Eda Eltemur (born 11 April 1999) is a Turkish karateka. She won the gold medal in the women's 68kg event at the 2022 European Karate Championships held in Gaziantep, Turkey. She is also a two-time medalist at the Islamic Solidarity Games and the Mediterranean Games.

Career 

At the 2017 Islamic Solidarity Games held in Baku, Azerbaijan, she won the silver medal in the women's kumite 68kg event.

In 2019, she won the silver medal in the women's team kumite event at the European Karate Championships held in Guadalajara, Spain.

She won one of the bronze medals in the women's 68kg event at the 2022 Mediterranean Games held in Oran, Algeria. She won one of the bronze medals in the women's 68kg event at the 2021 Islamic Solidarity Games held in Konya, Turkey.

Achievements

References

External links 
 

Living people
1999 births
People from Gölcük
Turkish female karateka
Islamic Solidarity Games medalists in karate
Islamic Solidarity Games competitors for Turkey
Competitors at the 2018 Mediterranean Games
Competitors at the 2022 Mediterranean Games
Mediterranean Games silver medalists for Turkey
Mediterranean Games bronze medalists for Turkey
Mediterranean Games medalists in karate
European champions for Turkey
21st-century Turkish sportswomen